One of many species of manzanita, Arctostaphylos manzanita has the common names common manzanita and whiteleaf manzanita.

Arctostaphylos manzanita is endemic to California, where it can be found in the Coast Ranges and Sierra Nevada foothills. It is common on chaparral slopes and low-elevation coniferous forest ecosystems.

Description
The Arctostaphylos manzanita leaves are bright shiny green, wedge-shaped and pointed. The small white flowers, only a quarter inch long, are cup-shaped and hang upside down. The fruits are berries which are white when new and turn red-brown as the summer wears on. The bark on the long, crooked branches is reddish, making the shrub easily identifiable as a manzanita. It grows into a twisted tree about 15 feet tall.

Like other manzanitas, this species has a hard, attractive wood that has proved useful for making tools and as firewood. The fruit is edible and has a pleasant tartness, but the seeds cause gastrointestinal upset if eaten in large quantities. It has historically been brewed into a cider, including by Native Americans. They are also consumed by bears and chipmunks.

Subspecies
There are several subspecies:
A. m. elegans - Konocti manzanita
A. m. glaucescens - Whiteleaf manzanita
A. m. laevigata - Contra Costa manzanita
A. m. manzanita - Whiteleaf manzanita
A. m. roofii - Roof's manzanita
A. m. wieslanderi - Wieslander's manzanita

See also
California chaparral and woodlands ecoregion

References

Casebeer, M. (2004). Discover California Shrubs. Sonora, California: Hooker Press.

External links

USDA Plants Profile: Arctostaphylos manzanita
Jepson Manual Treatment - Arctostaphylos manzanita

manzanita
Endemic flora of California
Flora of the Sierra Nevada (United States)
Natural history of the California chaparral and woodlands
Natural history of the California Coast Ranges
Natural history of the San Francisco Bay Area
Endemic flora of the San Francisco Bay Area
Taxa named by Charles Christopher Parry
Flora without expected TNC conservation status